The Roundabouts of Handsome Karl is a 1938 German comedy film directed by Carl Froelich and starring Heinz Rühmann, Karin Hardt, and Sybille Schmitz. It portrays the experiences of a young waiter during the Great Depression.

Partial cast

References

External links

Films of Nazi Germany
German comedy films
German black-and-white films
1938 comedy films
Films directed by Carl Froelich
Films set in the 1920s
Tobis Film films
1930s German films